My Brother Khosrow (transit. Baradram Khosro) is a 2016 Iranian psychological film directed by Iranian director Ehsan Biglari. It is written by Parisa Hashempor and Ehsan Biglari himself. It produced by Saeid Malekan starring Shahab Hosseini as its leading cast.

This film which was its director's debut, was selected to be appeared in the New Look Section of the Fajr International Film Festival and screened on cinemas at May 2017.

It is a film about bipolar disorder and its consequences which received a lot of controversial criticism among Iranian film critics.

Story 
Khosrow (Shahab Hosseini), is the leading character of the film, has the bipolar disorder which is a mental disorder, and per his situation he has to stay for a while in his brother's (Nasser) house who is a dentist. His situation and his relation between himself and his brother has consequences for him to confront.

Cast 
 Shahab Hosseini
 Hengameh Ghaziani
 Nasser Hashemi
 Bita Farrahi 
 Kamshad Kooshan
 Hojjat Hassanpour Sargaroui

References

External links
 

Iranian drama films
2010s Persian-language films
2016 films
2010s psychological films
Persian cinema articles needing attention
Persian cinema articles needing an image
Films about bipolar disorder
2016 directorial debut films